The Latham Bungalow or Latham House in Paris, Idaho, at 152 S. 1st, East, was listed on the National Register of Historic Places in 1983.

It is a cottage built of "rusty yellow-brown brick, with a wood-sided, bed-molded gable and an outset hipped porch on battered, squared 'Greek Doric' wood posts."

It was deemed significant as a gable-front Colonial Revival style house with some influence of bungalow style.  Colonial Revival features include its columns and its symmetrical facade.

References

National Register of Historic Places in Bear Lake County, Idaho
Colonial Revival architecture in Idaho